The following is a list of mayors of the city of Aracaju, in Sergipe state, Brazil.

 Pedro Celestino de Rezende, 1892-1896 
 Manuel Antonio Carneiro Leão, 1896-1898 
 Jacinto Martins de Almeida Figueiredo, 1898-1900
 Ananias Azevedo, 1900-1902
 Francisco Monteiro de Carvalho Filho, 1902-1904
 Antônio Xavier de Assis, 1904-1906
 Alcino Fernandes de Barros, 1906-1908
 Francino de Andrade Melo, 1908-1910
 Antônio Teixeira Fontes, 1910-1912
 Aristides Napoleão de Carvalho, 1912-1913
 Francisco Antônio da Silva Costa, 1913-1914
 João de Góis Jr, 1914-1915 
 Alexandre de Oliveira Freire, 1915-1918 
 Jardelino Bittencourt, 1918-1919 
 Antonio Batista Bittencourt, 1919-1923 
 Adolfo Espinheira Freire de Carvalho, 1923-1925 
 Hunald Santaflor Cardoso, 1925-1926 
 Amintas José Jorge, 1926-1928
 Teófilo Correia Dantas, 1928-1930
 Marcelino José Jorge, 1930
 Camilo Calazans, 1930-1933
 Francisco de Souza Porto, 1933-1935
 Godofredo Diniz Gonçalves, 1935-1939
 Antonio Cabral, 1939-1941
 Carlos Alberto de Menezes Firpo, 1941-1942
 José Garcez Vieira, 1942-1945
 Mário Diniz Sobral, 1945-1946
 Josaphat Carlos Borges, 1946-1947
 Edgar Barroso, 1947
 Jorge de Oliveira Neto, 1947
 Sérgio Francisco da Silva, 1947
 Marcos Ferreira de Jesus, 1947-1951
 Walter de Assis Ferreira, 1951
 Aldebrando Franco de Menezes, 1951
 Antonio D’Ávila Nabuco, 1951-1952
 Mário Cabral, 1952
 Jorge Maynard, 1952-1955
 José Teixeira Machado, 1955
 Roosevelt Dantas Cardoso de Menezes, 1955-1959
 José Conrado de Araújo, 1959-1962
 José Pereira de Andrade, 1962-1963
 Godofredo Diniz Gonçalves, 1963-1964
 João Alves Bezerra, 1964-1967
 , 1967
 José Teixeira Machado, 1967-1968
 José Aloísio Campos, 1968-1971
 , 1971-1975
 João Alves Filho, 1975-1979, 2013-2017
 , 1979-1985
 , 1985
 Jackson Barreto, 1986-1988, 1993-1994
 , 1988	
 , 1989-1992 
 , 1994-1997	
 , 1997-2000
 Marcelo Déda, 2001-2006	
 , 2006-2012, 2017-

See also
 
 Aracaju history (in Portuguese)
 List of mayors of largest cities in Brazil (in Portuguese)
 List of mayors of capitals of Brazil (in Portuguese)

References

This article incorporates information from the Portuguese Wikipedia.

Sergipe politicians
Aracaju